Frank Mulcare is a New Zealand rugby league player who represented New Zealand.

Playing career
Born in Ngahere, Mulcare was a farmer.

Mulcare played for the Ngahere club and represented the West Coast and South Island.

He first made the New Zealand national rugby league team in 1951, being selected for the tour of Great Britain and France. He then toured Australia in 1952 and played in home test matches against Australia in 1953 and Great Britain in 1954.

In 1953 the American All Stars toured New Zealand. The squad had many injuries and so Mulcare was one of four New Zealanders who joined the touring squad.

Mulcare joined the New Zealand Police in 1958 and served for 16 years.

Legacy
Mulcare was named in the West Coast's 75th Jubilee team in 1989. He was named by the New Zealand Rugby League as a Legend of League in 2007.

References

Living people
New Zealand rugby league players
New Zealand national rugby league team players
West Coast rugby league team players
United States national rugby league team players
South Island rugby league team players
Rugby league second-rows
New Zealand police officers
New Zealand farmers
Year of birth missing (living people)